Amal Buddika Peiris (born 14 May 1983) is a Sri Lankan first-class cricketer. He made his first-class debut in the 2002–03 season, and later made his Twenty20 debut for Sebastianites Cricket and Athletic Club on 29 October 2005. He made his List A debut for Sebastianites Cricket and Athletic Club on 1 November 2005.

References

External links
 

1983 births
Living people
Sri Lankan cricketers
Kalutara Physical Culture Centre cricketers
Moratuwa Sports Club cricketers
Sebastianites Cricket and Athletic Club cricketers
People from Moratuwa